The 2004–05 was KF Laçi's fourth season competing in the Kategoria Superiore. It covered a period from 1 July 2004 to 30 June 2005. They were relegated back down to Albanian First Division after just one season in the top flight.

Season overview
Laçi set very negative records during its one-season stay at top flight. They did not win any games, and were able to gain only 2 points from 2 draws. They also set the record for the most consecutive losses, 31, and the record most consecutive matches without taking points, also 31. Laçi also changed management four times, starting with Ritvan Kulli,  Hysen Dedja, Luan Metani and Sinan Bardhi. They all failed to make an impact. Laçi also become the first team to concede more than 100 goals in one season and the first with less goals in one season, netting only 13. Seven hat-tricks were scored against Laçi during this season, a record in Albanian football.

Competitions

Kategoria Superiore

League table

Results summary

Results by round

Matches

Albanian Cup

Second round

Third round

References

External links

KF Laçi seasons
Laçi